= Thorarinn Ragabróðir Óleifsson =

Icelandic jurist

Þórarinn Ragabróðir Óleifsson (or Ólafsson) was an Icelandic jurist in the 10th century, sometimes considered the second or third in the line of jurists.

Þórarinn was the son of Óleif hjalti, a settler at Varmalæk in Borgarfjörður, and lived there after his father. His brothers were Glúmur, who was the second in line of Hallgerður Langbrók's husbands, and Ragi, who lived in Laugardalur and has certainly been the eldest of the brothers since Þórarinn was known by him and always called Ragabróðir.

Ragi's wife is said to have been the sister of Þorsteinn Ingólfsson (and daughter of Ingólfr Arnarsson) and this may have played a role in Þórarinn being elected to take over the office of law speaker from Hrafn Hængsson. His reign lasted from 950 to 969 A.D.

Thorarin's wife was Thordis (or Thurid), daughter of Olaf the Wicked, son of Thorstein, son of Audar the Deep-Souled.
